Dor Guez  is an Israeli artist of Christian Palestinian and Tunisian Jewish origin, founder of The Christian Palestinian Archive.

Biography
Guez was born in Baka, Jerusalem. On his father's side he is the grandson of a Holocaust survivor, and on his mother's side, the son of a Palestinian-Christian family from Lydda, Al-Monayer, who were among the 2% of the city population that remained in Lydda after the 1948 Arab–Israeli War, when the State of Israel was established.

Artistic career
Guez's photography, video, mixed media, and essays explore the relationship between art, narrative, and memory. Interrogating personal and official accounts of the past, Guez raises questions about contemporary art's role in narrating unwritten histories and re-contextualizing visual and written documents. Since 2006, his ongoing research focuses on archival materials of the region and his biracial background.

In 2006, Guez began working on his Palestinian archival project. Using photographs from the first half of the 20th century, the images also depict Guez's family from Jaffa and Lydda. After completing his studies, he exhibited solo exhibitions at the Petach Tikva Museum of Art (2009) and at the Tel Aviv Museum of Art (2011). The two exhibitions dealt with the ramifications of the 1948 war on the Palestinian minority in Israel and aroused a public debate. Thereafter, Guez is active both as an artist and educator in raising awareness about the Israeli occupation. Currently he serves as the head of the Master in Fine Art at Bezalel Academy of Arts and Design. On the occasion of Guez's solo exhibition at The ICA London in collaboration with the A. M. Qattan Foundation, Guez was described as "a leading critical and artistic voice from the Middle East". Guez received his PhD in 2014.

Eight catalogs have been published internationally about Guez's practice. Publishers include Distanz, New England Press, and A.M Qattan Foundation. Guez's work has been displayed in over thirty solo exhibitions worldwide; MAN Museum, Nuoro (2018); DEPO, Istanbul (2017); the Museum for Islamic Art, Jerusalem (2017); the Museum of Contemporary Art, Detroit (2016); the Institute of Contemporary Arts, London (2015); the Center for Contemporary Art, Tel Aviv (2015); the Rose Art Museum, Brandeis University, Massachusetts (2013); Artpace, San Antonio (2013); the Mosaic Rooms, Centre for Contemporary Arab Culture & Art, London (2013); the KW Institute for Contemporary Art, Berlin (2010); and Petach Tikva Museum of Art, (2009). He has participated in numerous group exhibitions, including shows at MODEM Museum (2018); The Arab World Institute (2017); the Buenos Aires Museum of Modern Art (2016); the North Coast Art Triennial, Denmark (2016); Weatherspoon Art Museum, Greensboro, North Carolina (2015); the 17th, 18th, and 19th International Contemporary Art Festival Videobrasil, São Paulo (2011, 2013, 2015); the 8th Berlin Biennial for Contemporary Art (2014); Cleveland Institute of Art (2014); Triennale Museum, Milan (2014); Centre of Contemporary Art, Torun (2014); Tokyo Metropolitan Museum of Photography (2014); MAXXI Museum, Rome (2013); Palais de Tokyo, Paris (2012); the 12th Istanbul Biennial (2011); and the Museum of Modern Art, Ljubljana (2010).

Private life 
Dor Guez is openly gay. He is married to the American stylist Darnell Ross. The couple has a daughter. Guez lives and works in Jaffa and New York City.

Bibliography

Dor Guez: The Sick Man of Europe: The Architect, Museum of Contemporary Art Detroit, Texts by: Chelsea Haines, Kamal P. and Dor Guez, MOCAD, Detroit, 2015.
Dor Guez: The Sick Man of Europe: The Painter, ICA London, Texts by: Achim Borchardt-Hume, D.Guez and Dor Guez, Published by: A. M. Qattan Foundation and ICA, London, 2015.
Dor Guez: 40 Days, The Mosaic Rooms, Texts by: Omar al-Qattan, Mitra Abbaspour, and Dor Guez, Published by: Al-Qattan Foundation, Contemporary Culture from the Arab World, 2013.
Dor Guez: 100 Steps to the Mediterranean, The Rose Art Museum, Texts by: Samir Srouji, Gannit Ankori, Dabney Hailey, and Dor Guez, Published by: New England Press, 2012.
Dor Guez: The Nation's Groves, Tel Aviv Museum of Art: Nathan Gottesdiener Foundation, Texts by: Ellen Ginton, and Efrat Livny, Published by: Tel Aviv Museum of Art, 2011.
Dor Guez: Al-Lydd, KW Institute for Contemporary Art, Berlin, Texts by: Susanne Pfeffer, Felix Ensslin, Ariella Azoulay, and Dor Guez, Published by: DISTANZ Verlag, Berlin, 2010.
Dor Guez: Georgiopolis, Petach Tikva Museum of Art, Texts by: Drorit Gur Arie, Ariella Azoulay, Gil Eyal, Michal Heiman and Dor Guez, Published by: Petach Tikva Museum of Art, 2009.

Public collections
Guez's works are held in numerous international public collections, including Rose Art Museum (Boston), FRAC collection (Marseille), Israel Museum (Jerusalem), Schocken collection (Te Aviv), BNL collection (Italy), Petach Tikva Museum of Art (Petach Tikva), Brandis University (Waltham), Recanati collection (New York), Beit Hatfutsot (Tel Aviv), amongst others.

Dor Guez is represented by Dvir Gallery in Tel Aviv and Brussels  and Galerie carlier|gebauer, Berlin.

Awards and recognition
Guez is the recipient of The Ruth Ann and Nathan Perlmutter Artist in Residency Award, Rose Art Museum, Brandeis University; and International Artist in Residence Award, Artpace, San Antonio.

See also
Visual arts in Israel

References

External links

Israeli Arab Christians
Israeli people of Tunisian-Jewish descent
Israeli photographers
Israeli gay artists
Gay photographers
Living people
People from Jaffa
People from Jerusalem
Tel Aviv University alumni
Year of birth missing (living people)
Israeli LGBT photographers
21st-century Israeli LGBT people